Esnaider Reales (born 28 April 1996) is a Colombian swimmer. He competed in the men's 50 metre butterfly event at the 2018 FINA World Swimming Championships (25 m), in Hangzhou, China.

References

External links
 

1996 births
Living people
Colombian male swimmers
Male butterfly swimmers
Place of birth missing (living people)
20th-century Colombian people
21st-century Colombian people
Pan American Games competitors for Colombia
Swimmers at the 2015 Pan American Games
Swimmers at the 2019 Pan American Games
Competitors at the 2018 South American Games
South American Games medalists in swimming
South American Games gold medalists for Colombia
South American Games silver medalists for Colombia
South American Games bronze medalists for Colombia
Competitors at the 2018 Central American and Caribbean Games
Central American and Caribbean Games medalists in swimming
Central American and Caribbean Games silver medalists for Colombia
Central American and Caribbean Games bronze medalists for Colombia